Rzhavets is a rural locality (a village) in Novokirsanovskoye Rural Settlement, Ternovsky District, Voronezh Oblast, Russia. The population was 408 as of 2010. There are 4 streets.

Geography 
Rzhavets is located 22 km south of Ternovka (the district's administrative centre) by road. Novokirsanovka is the nearest rural locality.

References 

Rural localities in Ternovsky District